Darkan (also Romanized as Darkān, Darakān, and Derkān; also known as Deh Khān) is a village in Kabutarsorkh Rural District, in the Central District of Chadegan County, Isfahan Province, Iran. At the 2006 census, its population was 62, in 18 families.

References 

Populated places in Chadegan County